The 1914–15 season saw Rochdale compete in The FA Cup for the 7th time and reached the second round proper. The also competed in the Central League and finished 9th.

Statistics

|}

Competitions

Central League

F.A. Cup

Lancashire Senior Cup

Manchester Senior Cup

References

Rochdale A.F.C. seasons
Rochdale